Sir Charles Murray Marling  (3 December 1862 – 17 February 1933) was a British diplomat.

Early life
Marling was born on 3 December 1862 in the village of King's Stanley near Stroud, Gloucestershire, the second son of Sir William Marling, 2nd Baronet. His brother was Percival Marling who was awarded the Victoria Cross. He was educated at Wellington and Trinity College, Cambridge before joining the Diplomatic Service in 1888.

Diplomat
On 8 March 1919 he was appointed as the minister to Denmark.
He was the British ambassador during the constitutional revolution in Iran in 1905-1907.

From 1921 he was based at the Hague from where he retired five years later, he was promoted to Knight Grand Cross of the Order of St Michael and St George.

Honours
He was awarded the Grand Cross of Order of the Dannebrog for service in Denmark.
He was appointed a Companion of the Order of the Bath (CB) in the 1911 Coronation Honours.
On 3 June 1916 Marling was appointed as a Knight Commander of the Order of St Michael and St George (KCMG).
On 5 June 1926 Marling was promoted to Knight Grand Cross of the Order of St Michael and St George (GCMG).

Family life
In 1909, Marling married Lucia Slade, the only daughter of Sir John Ramsay Slade and granddaughter of Marcus Slade. They had two daughters and a son. Lucia died in 1927 in a motoring accident at Deippe, France. Marling died at his London home on 16 February 1933 aged 70.

References

1862 births
1933 deaths
Ambassadors of the United Kingdom to Denmark
Knights Grand Cross of the Order of St Michael and St George
Companions of the Order of the Bath
Grand Crosses of the Order of the Dannebrog
Ambassadors of the United Kingdom to the Netherlands
Ambassadors of the United Kingdom to Iran
Alumni of Trinity College, Cambridge
People educated at Wellington College, Berkshire
People from Stroud District